De Villegas is a surname. Notable people with the surname include:

Andrés Rodríguez de Villegas (died 1633), Spanish colonial governor
Diogo Ortiz de Villegas (1457–1519), Spanish Roman Catholic priest
Esteban Manuel de Villegas (1589–1669), Spanish poet
Hipólito de Villegas (c. 1761 – 1838), Chilean politician
Pedro Ruiz de Villegas II (c. 1304–1355), Spanish noble
Pedro de Villegas Marmolejo (1519–1596), Spanish Renaissance sculptor and painter
Maria de Villegas de Saint-Pierre (1870-1941), Belgian Countess, writer, nurse and philanthropist

See also
Liga Georgina de Villegas, basketball league in Honduras
15785 de Villegas, main-belt minor planet
Villegas (disambiguation)